Artem Aleksandrovich Volvich (born 22 January 1990) is a Russian volleyball player, a member of Russia men's national volleyball team and Russian club VC Zenit-Kazan.

Career
On March 17, 2013, he achieved with Lokomotiv Novosibirsk gold medal of the 2012–13 CEV Champions League. In 2013 he won the gold medal at the Universiade. He was a member of the Russian team at the 2016 Olympics and he received and individual award for the Best Middle Blocker. At his second Olympics in Tokyo, he won the silver medal.

Sporting achievements

Clubs

CEV Champions League
  2012/2013 – with Lokomotiv Novosibirsk
  2016/2017 – with Zenit Kazan
  2017/2018 – with Zenit Kazan
  2018/2019 – with Zenit Kazan

FIVB Club World Championship
  Betim 2013 – with Lokomotiv Novosibirsk
  Betim 2016 – with Zenit Kazan
  Poland 2017 - with Zenit Kazan
  Brazil 2019 – with Zenit Kazan

National championships
 2011/2012  Russian Cup 2012, with Lokomotiv Novosibirsk
 2013/2014  Russian Championship, with Lokomotiv Novosibirsk
 2016/2017  Russian SuperCup 2016, with Zenit Kazan
 2016/2017  Russian Cup, with Zenit Kazan
 2016/2017  Russian Championship, with Zenit Kazan
 2017/2018  Russian SuperCup 2017, with Zenit Kazan
 2017/2018  Russian Cup, with Zenit Kazan
 2018/2019  Russian Championship, with Zenit Kazan

National team
 2017  CEV European Championship
 2018  FIVB Nations League

Individual
 2016 Olympic Games – Best Middle Blocker
 2016 FIVB Club World Championship – Best Middle Blocker
 2016/2017 CEV Champions League – Best Middle Blocker
 2019 FIVB Club World Championship – Best Middle Blocker

References

External links
FIVB profile

1990 births
Living people
Russian men's volleyball players
Olympic volleyball players of Russia
Volleyball players at the 2016 Summer Olympics
Universiade medalists in volleyball
Ural Ufa volleyball players
Universiade gold medalists for Russia
People from Khanty-Mansi Autonomous Okrug
Medalists at the 2013 Summer Universiade
Volleyball players at the 2020 Summer Olympics
Medalists at the 2020 Summer Olympics
Olympic silver medalists for the Russian Olympic Committee athletes
Olympic medalists in volleyball
Middle blockers
VC Zenit Kazan players
Sportspeople from Khanty-Mansi Autonomous Okrug
20th-century Russian people
21st-century Russian people